Karen Jean Morrison-Comstock (born August 4, 1954) is an American model and beauty queen from St. Charles, Illinois who held the Miss USA 1974 title.

Pageants
Comstock entered the Miss Illinois USA pageant at the suggestion of her modeling agency who owned the franchise and her sister who encouraged her to participate.  Paula Zahn, an acquaintance of Comstock also competed and placed in the top five. She won and a month later represented her state in the Miss USA pageant, held in Niagara Falls, New York on May 18, 1974.  Comstock won the nationally televised pageant and was crowned by Amanda Jones, also of Illinois.  She was crowned in a custom-made white chiffon gown made by Alyce Hamm of Alyce Designs.  Her prize winnings included $7,500 cash, a $7,500 appearance contract, $3,000 in scholarships as well as a new car, color television, stereo and clothing.  At the time Comstock was one of the tallest contestants ever to win a major beauty pageant.

Comstock represented the United States in the Miss Universe pageant broadcast from Manila in the Philippines two months after winning her national title.  This was only the third time that the pageant had been held outside the United States, and the first held in Asia. Continuing the strong history of the United States in this pageant, Comstock placed in the semi-finals.  The pageant was won by Amparo Muñoz of Spain.

During her reign she traveled extensively and met celebrities, including Jack Lemmon, Bobby Vinton, Omar Sharif and Joe Namath.

Personal life
Comstock attended Haines Junior High School and St. Charles High School.  She was a freshman at the University of Wisconsin when she won the Miss USA title but left to pursue modeling in New York City.    In 1976 she returned home to Illinois, embraced fundamentalist Protestant Christianity and toured the United States representing a non-profit organization called Sharing Ministries.

She later married Gordon Comstock and has four children.

References

External links
Miss Illinois USA official website
Miss USA official website

1955 births
Living people
Miss Universe 1974 contestants
Miss USA winners
People from St. Charles, Illinois